Corang is a locality in the Queanbeyan–Palerang Regional Council, New South Wales, Australia. It is located on the north side of the Corang River and to the east of the road from Braidwood to Nowra about 46 km north of Braidwood and 75 km southwest of Nowra. It consists mainly of forest and most of it lies in the Morton National Park. Its eastern boundary runs along the Budawang Range and includes Mount Tarn, Sturgiss Mountain and Quiltys Mountain.

Corang had a "half-time" school from 1868 to 1871.

References

Localities in New South Wales
Queanbeyan–Palerang Regional Council
Southern Tablelands